KD Keris is the lead ship of Keris-class littoral mission ship of the Royal Malaysian Navy. She built by Chinese company China Shipbuilding and Offshore International Co. Ltd and this class of ship was the first major Chinese made equipment purchased by RMN.

Development
Keris was first built on 31 July 2018 at Wucang Port, Wuhan and was launched by then wife of the Minister of Defense, Normah Alwi on 15 April 2019. Keris physical handover ceremony to the Government of Malaysia was completed by the Final Acceptance Committee led by the Secretary of the Procurement Division, Ministry of Defense, Datuk Ahmad Husaini Abdul Rahman, on 31 December 2019. She then commissioned on 6 January 2020 at China Shipbuilding and Offshore International Co. Ltd facility in Wucang Port, Qidong, Shanghai, China.

References

2019 ships
Keris-class littoral mission ships
Ships built in China